Carol Hedges is a British author of books for children, young adults and adults. Her novel Jigsaw, about a teenager's suicide, was shortlisted for the Angus Book Award and nominated for the Carnegie Medal in 2001. Her most recent works are the Spy Girl series for teenagers and the Diamonds & Dust adult mystery series, published by Crooked Cat and featuring the Victorian detectives Leo Stride and Jack Cully.

She lives in Hertfordshire with her husband and grown-up daughter.

Books 

Ring of Silver, Lord of Time (1992)
Guardian Angel (1993)
Three's a Crowd (1994)
There's More to Life than Pizza (1995)
Check It Out! with Mark (1996)
Red Velvet (2001)
Jigsaw (2001)
Bright Angel (2003)
Spy Girl: The Other Side of Midnight (2005)
Spy Girl: Out of the Shadows (2006)
Spy Girl: Once Upon a Crime (2007)
Spy Girl: Dead Man Talking (2008)
 Jigsaw Pieces (2012), ebook
 Diamonds & Dust (2013)
 Honour & Obey (2014)

References

External links
Author's website
 

Living people
20th-century British novelists
21st-century British novelists
British children's writers
British writers of young adult literature
British mystery writers
Year of birth missing (living people)
Place of birth missing (living people)